Sisicus is a genus of sheet weavers that was first described by S. C. Bishop & C. R. Crosby in 1938.  it contains only three species, found in North America, Europe, Siberia, and East Asia: S. apertus, S. penifusifer, and S. volutasilex.

See also
 List of Linyphiidae species (Q–Z)

References

Araneomorphae genera
Holarctic spiders
Linyphiidae
Spiders of North America